The University of Carthage is a university located in Tunis, Tunisia, and was founded in 1988.

Organization
University of Carthage is formed by 21 institutions under single-supervision and 12 under joint-supervision. The first category is composed by: 
 Faculty of Juridical, Political and Social Sciences, Tunis
 Faculty of Sciences, Bizerte
 Faculty of Economic Sciences and Management, Nabeul
 National School of Architecture and Urbanism, Tunis
 Tunisia Polytechnic School
 Higher School of Technology and Computer Science
 Higher School of Statistics and Information Analysis 	  
 The Gammarth Higher Institute of Audiovisual and Film Studies
 Bizerte Preparatory Engineering Institute
 Institute of Advanced Business Studies, Carthage
National Institute of Applied Science and Technology
 Higher Institute of Applied Sciences and Technology, Mateur
 Nabeul Preparatory Engineering Institute
 Preparatory Institute for Scientific and Technical Studies, La Marsa
 Higher Institute of Fine Arts, Nabeul 	  
 Higher Institute of Environment, Urbanism and Building Technologies
 Higher Institute of Languages, Tunis 	  
 Higher Institute of Applied Languages and Computer Science of Nabeul
 Higher Institute of Sciences and Technology of Environment of Borj Cedria
 Higher Institute of Business and Accountancy of Bizerte
 National Engineering School of Bizerte

The second category contains basically:
 Higher School of Communication of Tunis

See also

 List of Arab Universities
 List of universities in Tunisia
 Tunis
 Carthage

Notes

External links
Université de Carthage Website 

 
1988 establishments in Tunisia
Educational institutions established in 1988
Education in Tunis